The 2003 Aaron's 499 was held on April 6, 2003, at Talladega Superspeedway in Talladega, Alabama. It was the eighth race of 36 in the 2003 NASCAR Winston Cup Series season. Jeremy Mayfield was the polesitter.

Dale Earnhardt Jr. won the race, his first win of the season and fourth consecutive at Talladega, becoming the 8th different winner in the first 8 races, while Kevin Harvick finished second and Elliott Sadler finished third. This was also the fifth consecutive restrictor plate race win for Dale Earnhardt, Inc. stretching back to the previous year's spring Talladega race. There were six cautions, 16 different leaders, and 43 lead changes. The Big One did not take long, collecting 27 cars on the fourth lap — the largest crash in a Cup race in the modern era.

Race Summary

The "Big One"
On lap 4, as the field entered turn 1, Ryan Newman (who already had a violent blowover at the rain shortened Daytona 500 in February) blew a tire and smashed hard into the turn 1 wall, almost turning over on his side and spinning across the middle of the track, collecting an additional 26 cars. Mayhem ensued as cars behind him checked up trying to avoid Newman, whose car suddenly burst into flames. One of Newman's tires came off and got struck by Ricky Rudd's hood, causing it to bounce right over the catch fence and land in a restricted access area.

A total of 27 cars were involved, making it the largest recorded crash in the history of the NASCAR Winston Cup Series. It was also the second largest-crash overall in modern NASCAR, behind a 30 car crash on the back straightaway in Talladega's Busch race the year before. Damage to the cars involved ranged from no damage to severe damage; Hermie Sadler, Casey Mears, Johnny Benson, and some others were out immediately. Rusty Wallace and Jerry Nadeau returned but retired after making a limited number of laps following repairs. Matt Kenseth and race winner Dale Earnhardt Jr. also had minor damage. Kenseth finished inside the Top 10 on the lead lap. After the wreck, there were only 16 cars that did not have damage. Coincidentally, during the Busch race the day prior, the "Big One" occurred in turn 4 on lap 10 when Johnny Sauter blew a tire in the middle of the pack, collecting 22 cars.

Cars involved in the crash
 0- Jack Sprague
 01- Jerry Nadeau
 02- Hermie Sadler
 09- Mike Wallace
 1- Steve Park
 2- Rusty Wallace
 4- Mike Skinner
 6- Mark Martin
 7- Jimmy Spencer
 8- Dale Earnhardt Jr. (eventual winner)
 10- Johnny Benson
 12- Ryan Newman
 16- Greg Biffle
 17- Matt Kenseth (championship points leader)
 18- Bobby Labonte
 20- Tony Stewart
 21- Ricky Rudd
 25- Joe Nemechek
 30- Jeff Green
 41- Casey Mears
 42- Jamie McMurray
 43- John Andretti
 45- Kyle Petty
 49- Ken Schrader
 54- Todd Bodine
 77- Dave Blaney
 99- Jeff Burton

Dale Earnhardt Jr.'s comeback
Perhaps the most well noted one involved in the Big One was Dale Earnhardt Jr., who started in 43rd place because of an engine change after qualifying. In the crash, Earnhardt Jr. went off the banking and down into the grass, making contact with Jeff Green's car that damaged his fender. He struggled for most of the race, at times going close to a half-lap down, until late in the race when he took the lead away from Matt Kenseth, who was also involved earlier, and won his fourth straight race at Talladega. Earnhardt Jr. swept the weekend, having won the Busch Series race the previous day. Jimmie Johnson led the most laps of the race, but had a 15th-place finish when he spun out right before the white flag. By coincidence, the Big Ones that unfolded in both the weekend's Cup and Busch races at Talladega were the result of a car blowing a tire in the middle of the track (Ryan Newman in turn 1 in the Cup race, and Johnny Sauter in turn 4 in the Busch race the day prior).

Double yellow line controversy
Earnhardt Jr. was involved in a controversial decision at the end of the race where it appeared he went below the yellow line in an attempt to improve position. As the cars were racing down the back straightaway, leader Matt Kenseth made a lane change, going to the outside to block Jimmie Johnson. Earnhardt Jr. was on the inside and was drafting with Elliott Sadler when Kenseth started moving low in an attempt to block Earnhardt; Earnhardt stormed well below the line entering the turn three apron as he passed Kenseth. NASCAR ruled that Earnhardt was forced below the line as his car's nose had already passed Kenseth's nose by the time Kenseth made the block, making it a clean pass in their opinion, this even though Earnhardt was nowhere close to clearing Kenseth when he hit the apron — what the rule was ostensibly intended to prevent. Some sanctioning bodies, such as the Indy Racing League, would have called Kenseth for violating the blocking rule — a driver is not allowed to make two lane changes on a straightaway, which is a penalty; the ethic against blocking, however, holds no weight in NASCAR given the fendered nature of the cars. The yellow line rule's absurdity belatedly led to discussion in the sanctioning body in January 2010 to possibly rescind it, though it was decided to maintain the rule "for the time being," according to NASCAR official Robin Pemberton.

In the years to come, the yellow lines would provide several controversial moments, such as Regan Smith being penalized by passing Tony Stewart below the yellow line in the fall race in 2008, as well as a confusing finish in 2020. NASCAR decided to put another yellow line for the next year, in both Daytona and Talladega.

Race results

Failed to qualify
Brett Bodine (#11)
Larry Foyt (#14)
David Green (#60), time disallowed

Race facts
Average speed: 144.625 mph
Margin of victory: .125 seconds
Time of race: 03:27:28
Lead changes: 43 among 16 different drivers
Cautions: 6 for 32 laps
 Laps 5-13: The "Big One" in turn 2
 Laps 37-40: Debris	 
 Laps 64-67: Debris
 Laps 84-89: Michael Waltrip, Elliott Sadler, and Jeremy Mayfield crash in turn 3
 Laps 91-94: Greg Biffle, Kurt Busch, and Tony Stewart crash in  turn 4	 
 Laps 133-137: Debris 
Percent of race run under caution: 17.0%           
Average green flag run: 22.3 laps

Points standings after race
1. Matt Kenseth 1233 (Leader)
2. Dale Earnhardt Jr. 1104 (-129)
3. Kurt Busch 1046 (-187)
4. Jimmie Johnson 1013 (-220)
5. Jeff Gordon 1011 (-222)
6. Ricky Craven 1000 (-223)
7. Michael Waltrip 994 (-239)
8. Kevin Harvick 977 (-256)
9. Tony Stewart 937 (-296)
10. Elliott Sadler 895 (-338)

See also
The Big One (NASCAR)

References

Aaron's 499
Aaron's 499
NASCAR races at Talladega Superspeedway
April 2003 sports events in the United States
NASCAR controversies